NDAA may refer to:

National Defense Authorization Act in the US
 "NDAA" is used colloquially for the section added in 2012  allowing indefinite detention of Americans without charges, showing cause, or due process.
National Democratic Alliance Army in Burma
National District Attorneys Association
North Dallas Adventist Academy